David Heinemeier Hansson is a Danish programmer, and the creator of the popular Ruby on Rails web development framework and the Instiki wiki. He is also a partner at the web-based software development firm Basecamp.

Hansson co-wrote Agile Web Development with Rails with Dave Thomas in 2005 as part of The Facets of Ruby Series. He also co-wrote Getting Real, Rework, Remote, and It Doesn't Have to Be Crazy at Work with Jason Fried.

Programming 
In 1999, Hansson founded and built a Danish online gaming news website and community called Daily Rush, which he ran until 2001. After attracting the attention of Jason Fried by offering him help with PHP coding, Hansson was hired by Fried to build a web-based project management tool, which ultimately became 37signals' Basecamp software as a service product. To aid the development process, Hansson used the then-relatively obscure Ruby programming language to develop a custom web framework. He released the framework separately from the project management tool in 2004 as the open source project Ruby on Rails. In 2005, Hansson was recognized by Google and O'Reilly with the "Hacker of the Year" award for his creation of Ruby on Rails. After graduating from the Copenhagen Business School and receiving his bachelor's degree in Computer Science and Business Administration, Hansson moved from Denmark to Chicago, Illinois, U.S. in November 2005.

Personal life

David Heinemeier Hansson lists photography and race car driving amongst his many hobbies. He took part in the 2012 24 Hours of Le Mans driving for OAK Racing. He also drove a Morgan-Nissan P2 car for Conquest Racing in the American Le Mans Series (ALMS), winning two races in the season. Heinemeier Hansson joined OAK Racing full-time in 2013, taking five 2nd-place finishes to finish 2nd in the Trophy for LMP2 Drivers. During the 2017 24 Hours of Le Mans post-race technical checks, certain irregularities were detected on the Vaillante Rebellion team's #13 Oreca 07-Gibson, resulting in the car's disqualification. In July 2010 it was revealed that Heinemeier Hansson was the person that had commissioned the one-off Pagani Zonda HH supercar. He also commissioned the Koenigsegg Agera HH, which was sold in 2022 to Houston Crosta, a YouTube video creator in Las Vegas. Heinemeier Hansson also purchased an Aston Martin Valkyrie.

24 Hours of Le Mans results

Complete FIA World Endurance Championship results

† As Heinemeier Hansson was a guest driver, he was ineligible for points.

Complete European Le Mans Series results
(Races in bold indicate pole position; results in italics indicate fastest lap)

* Season still in progress.

WeatherTech SportsCar Championship results
(Races in bold indicate pole position, Results are overall/class)

† Points only counted towards the Michelin Endurance Cup, and not the overall LMP2 Championship.

Recognition
2005: Won Best Hacker of the Year 2005 at OSCON from Google and O'Reilly for the work on Rails.
2006: Accepted the Jolt Award of product excellence for Rails 1.0.
2012: Named ALMS Rookie of the year.

References

External links

 Loud Thinking - Hansson's weblog
 
 37signals
 Ruby on Rails
 Video of David Heinemeier Hansson presentation at Startup School
 David Heinemeier Hansson - The Pareto Principle and Stoic Philosophy on Developer on Fire
 David Heinemeier Hansson interview on the Inside the Net Podcast
 Martin Fowler and David Heinemeier Hansson interview on Hanselminutes Podcast
 David Heinemeier Hansson interview in Danish  on Builder.dk Podcast
 Podcast interview with David Heinemeier Hansson on the Web 2.0 Show
 Ruby on Rails video David Heinemeier Hansson explains Ruby on Rails at the university of Roskilde, in 2004
 Keynote 2007 - RailsConf Europe 2007 - Berlin
 RailsConf Keynote on REST. July 9, 2006
 The Great Surplus - Keynote at RailsConf 2008 - Portland
 Living with legacy software - Keynote at RailsConf Europe 2008 - Berlin
 FLOSS Weekly podcast 79 and its transcription
 Podcast interview with David Heinemeier Hansson on This Developer's Life
 Podcast interview with David Heinemeier Hansson on the alphalist CTO podcast where he talks about Hey, the no-notification life and other thoughts on technical leadership. 2020

24 Hours of Daytona drivers
24 Hours of Le Mans drivers
American Le Mans Series drivers
Copenhagen Business School alumni
Danish bloggers
Danish computer programmers
Danish computer scientists
Danish expatriates in the United States
Danish racing drivers
European Le Mans Series drivers
FIA World Endurance Championship drivers
Living people
People from Copenhagen
Sportspeople from Copenhagen
WeatherTech SportsCar Championship drivers
Web developers
Year of birth missing (living people)
Extreme Speed Motorsports drivers
Jota Sport drivers
Rebellion Racing drivers
Aston Martin Racing drivers
OAK Racing drivers
Conquest Racing drivers
Greaves Motorsport drivers
Starworks Motorsport drivers